The Denver Underground Film Festival (DUFF) premiered November 21–23, 1997 at The Bug Theater in Denver, Colorado. Since then the visions of hundreds of independent filmmakers from around the world have been showcased, including films by classic experimental and avant-garde filmmakers like Stan Brakhage, Luis Buñuel, Fassbinder, and Man Ray.

References

External links
 Official site
 Oldest site capture (2003) by Internet Archive of the former duffcinema.com domain
 2013 site capture by Internet Archive of the former duffcinema.com domain

Film festivals in Colorado
Festivals in Denver
Tourist attractions in Denver
Underground film festivals
Experimental film festivals